Passione is a 1934 Neapolitan song with text by Libero Bovio (d.1942) and melody by Ernesto Tagliaferri and Nicola Valente. The song was a standard piece in the repertoire of tenors such as Mario Lanza, Giuseppe di Stefano and Luciano Pavarotti.

References 

Neapolitan songs
1934 songs